Šebek is a Bohemian-Czechoslovakian Slavic surname. 

It may refer to:

 Jan Šebek (born 1991) Czech soccer player
 Josef Šebek (born 1888) Bohemian tennis player
 Lukáš Šebek (born 1988) Slovak soccer player
 Nick Sebek (1927-2007) Slavic-American NFL American-football player
 Zdeněk Šebek (born 1959) Czechoslovakian paralympic archer